Jim Page (born May 29, 1941) is an American skier. He competed in the Nordic combined event at the 1964 Winter Olympics. Page later became a coach, and in 1987 was involved in a blood doping scheme with American skier Kerry Lynch, who subsequently had his silver medal for 15 km individual event at the 1987 FIS Nordic World Ski Championships stripped. Page was given a lifetime ban from the sport, which was later lifted in 1990.

References

External links
 

1941 births
Living people
American male Nordic combined skiers
Olympic Nordic combined skiers of the United States
Nordic combined skiers at the 1964 Winter Olympics
People from Lake Placid, New York
Doping cases in Nordic combined